The Afghan Girls Robotics Team, also known as the Afghan Dreamers, is an all-girl robotics team from Herat, Afghanistan, founded in 2017 by Roya Mahboob and made up of girls between ages 12 and 18 and their mentors.

Origins
The Afghan Girls Robotics Team was founded in 2017 by Roya Mahboob, who is their coach, mentor and sponsor, and founder of the Digital Citizen Fund (DCF), which is the parent organization for the team. Dean Kamen was planning a 2017 competition in the United States and had recruited Mahboob to form a team from Afghanistan. Out of 150 girls, 12 were selected for the first team. Before parts were sent by Kamen, they trained in the basement of the home of Mahboob's parents, with scrap metal and without safety equipment under the guidance of their coach, Mahboob's brother Alireza Mehraban.

2017 and 2018
In 2017, six members of the Afghan Girls Robotics Team traveled to the United States to participate in the international FIRST Global Challenge robotics competition. Their visas were rejected twice after they made two journeys from Herat to Kabul through Taliban-controlled areas, before officials in the United States government intervened to allow them to enter the United States. Customs officials also detained their robotics kits, which left them two weeks to construct their robot, unlike some teams that had more time. They were awarded a Silver medal for Courageous Achievement. One week after they returned home from the competition, the father of team captain Fatemah Qaderyan, Mohammad Asif Qaderyan, was killed in a suicide bombing.

After their United States visas expired, the team participated in competitions in Estonia and Istanbul. Three of the 12 members participated in the 2017 Entrepreneurial Challenge at the Robotex festival in Estonia, and won the competition for their solar-powered robot designed to assist farmers. In 2018, the team trained in Canada, continued to travel in the United States for months and participate in competitions.

2020
In March 2020, the governor of Herat at the time, in response to the COVID-19 pandemic in Afghanistan and a scarcity of ventilators, sought help with the design of low-cost ventilators, and the Afghan Girls Robotics Team was one of six teams contacted by the government. Using a design from Massachusetts Institute of Technology and with guidance from MIT engineers and Douglas Chin, a surgeon in California, the team developed a prototype with Toyota Corolla parts and a chain drive from a Honda motorcycle. UNICEF also supported the team with the acquisition of necessary parts during the three months they spent building the prototype that was completed in July 2020. Their design costs around $500 compared to $50,000 for a ventilator.

In December 2020, Minister of Industry and Commerce Nizar Ahmad Ghoryani donated funding and obtained land for a factory to produce the ventilators. Under the direction of their mentor Roya Mahboob, the Afghan Dreamers also designed a UVC Robot for sanitization, and a Spray Robot for disinfection, both of which were approved by the Ministry of Health for production.

2021

In early August 2021, Somaya Faruqi, the current captain of the team, was quoted by Public Radio International about the future of Afghanistan, stating, "We don’t support any group over another but for us what’s important is that we be able to continue our work. Women in Afghanistan have made a lot of progress over the past two decades and this progress must be respected." On August 17, 2021, the Afghan Girls Robotics Team and their coaches were reported to be attempting to evacuate, but unable to obtain a flight out of Afghanistan, and that they appealed to Canada for assistance. As of August 19, 2021, it was reported some members of the team and their coaches had evacuated to Qatar. By August 25, 2021, some members arrived in Mexico. The members who have left Afghanistan participated in an online robotics competition in September and plan to continue their education.

A documentary film titled Afghan Dreamers, produced by Beth Murphy and directed by David Greenwald, was in post-production   when the team began to evacuate.

Honors and awards
 2017 Silver medal for Courageous Achievement at the FIRST Global Challenge, science and technology
 2017 Winner, Entrepreneurship Challenge at Robotex in Estonia
 2021 Forbes 30 Under 30 Asia

References

External links 
 

Women in Afghanistan
Women in engineering
21st-century Afghan women